Paracanthosybra vadoni is a species of beetle in the family Cerambycidae, and the only species in the genus Paracanthosybra. It was described by Breuning in 1980.

References

Apomecynini
Beetles described in 1980
Monotypic beetle genera